Tawfeeq Abdul Razzaq Al Hosani (born 1 July 1982) is a UAE football midfielder. He played for Al-Wahda and counts 6 apps in the AFC Champions League

He was chosen for United Arab Emirates squad at the 2004 Asian Cup but did not play.

External links

1982 births
Living people
2004 AFC Asian Cup players
Al Wahda FC players
Al Dhafra FC players
Place of birth missing (living people)
Emirati footballers
UAE First Division League players
UAE Pro League players
Association football midfielders